The Iran national beach soccer team represents Iran in international beach soccer competitions and is controlled by the IFF, the governing body for football in Iran. Iran is the best ranked beach soccer team in Asia and is ranked second in the world.

Iran has won the AFC Beach Soccer Championship a record two times (2013, 2017). Iran has also appeared in the FIFA Beach Soccer World Cup seven times, reaching the quarterfinals on three occasions (2013, 2015, 2017), and finishing in third place once (2017).

Team

Current squad
Correct as of November 2015

Coach: Marco Octávio

Fixtures & Results

2022
23 August 2022 Yazd :  3-2   Friendly Match 

24 August 2022 Yazd :  5-3   Friendly Match 

25 August 2022 Yazd :  7-0   Friendly Match 

2022 Beach Soccer Intercontinental Cup

2023
1 Feb 2023 Oman:  2-2 (3-2 P) (5-4)   Friendly Match 

3 Feb 2023 Oman:  3-4   Friendly Match

28 Feb 2023 Iran:  5-0   Friendly Match

1 March 2023 Iran:  7-3   Friendly Match

Tournament record

FIFA Beach Soccer World Cup

Beach Soccer Intercontinental Cup

World Beach Games

Persian Beach Soccer Cup

AFC beach Soccer Asian Cup Championship

Asian Beach Games

Continental Beach Soccer Tournament

WAFF Beach Soccer Championship

World Cup record

<div style="text-align:center">

History of coaches
 Farshad Falahatzadeh (2006)
 Marco Octávio (2007)
 Farshad Falahatzadeh (2008)
 Reza Sadeghpour (2009)
 Marco Octávio (2010)
 Behzad Dadashzadeh (2011)
 Marco Octávio (2012–2015)
 Mohammad Hossein Mirshamsi (2015–2017)
 Marco Octávio (2017–2019)
 Abbas Hashempour (2021–2022)
 Ali Naderi (2022–present)

Former notable players
Behzad Dadashzadeh
Farshad Falahatzadeh

References

External links
FIFA.com profile

Asian national beach soccer teams
Beach soccer
Beach soccer in Iran